The Middle Ages was a period in European history spanning the time from about the 5th to the 15th century (c. 476–1453).

Middle Ages or middle age may also refer to:
Middle age, a stage of life
Middle Age: A Romance, a 2001 novel by Joyce Carol Oates
The Middle Ages (play), the play by A. R. Gurney
Middle Ages (TV series), a 1992 American comedy-drama television series

Medieval or Mediaeval (the adjectival form of "Middle Ages") may refer to:
Middle Ages, the European historical period from the 5th to the 15th century.
Middle Ages in England
The term is also used to refer to periods in nations outside of Europe having similarities in social and military development, such as seen in:
History of Japan#Feudal Japan
Medieval history of Sri Lanka
Medieval India
Medieval architecture, a term used to represent various forms of architecture popular in the Middle Ages
Medieval music, the music tradition of Europe from 500 to 1500
Medieval Times, an American dinner theater chain
Medieval rock, modern (post-1980s) rock music tradition that use the Middle Ages as inspiration
Medieval: Total War, a computer strategy game
Medieval II: Total War, a 2006 computer strategy game by Microsoft that is a sequel to Medieval: Total War
Medieval (film), an 2022 Czech film
"Medieval", a song by James from the album Strip-mine
"Medieval", a song by Diecast from the album Tearing Down Your Blue Skies

See also
 MediEvil (series), a series of video games